Salaheddine Bakar Al-Safi (born 1 April 1980) is a Qatari sprinter. He competed in the men's 400 metres at the 2000 Summer Olympics.

References

External links
 

1980 births
Living people
Athletes (track and field) at the 2000 Summer Olympics
Qatari male sprinters
Olympic athletes of Qatar
Place of birth missing (living people)
Athletes (track and field) at the 2002 Asian Games
Asian Games competitors for Qatar